Arson Squad is a 1945 American crime film directed by Lew Landers and written by Arthur St. Claire. The film stars Frank Albertson, Robert Armstrong, Grace Albertson, Byron Foulger, Chester Clute, Jerry Jerome and Arthur Loft. The film was released on September 11, 1945, by Producers Releasing Corporation.

Plot

Cast          
Frank Albertson as Tom Mitchell
Robert Armstrong as Capt. Joe Dugan
Grace Albertson as Judy Mason
Byron Foulger as Amos Baxter
Chester Clute as Sam Purdy
Jerry Jerome as Mike C. Crandall
Arthur Loft as Cyrus P. Clevenger
Rod Rogers as Nick
Stewart Garner as Bill Roberts
Frank Wayne as Tracy
Ed Cassidy as Chief O'Neill 
Casey MacGregor as O'Malley
Herman Scharff as John W. Rawlins
Ezelle Poule as Miss McKee

References

External links
 

1945 films
American crime films
1945 crime films
Producers Releasing Corporation films
Films directed by Lew Landers
American black-and-white films
1940s English-language films
1940s American films